In Greek mythology, Phalerus (Ancient Greek: Φάληρος) was the son of Alcon from Athens. He is counted among the Argonauts. He also attended the wedding of Pirithous and Hippodamia.

Mythology
Phalerus was Alcon's only son, his father took pride in sending him forth to join the Argonauts, so that he would shine conspicuous among those bold heroes, “yet no other sons had he to care for his old age and livelihood”.

It is related of Phalerus that he escaped from Athens to Chalcis in Euboea together with his daughter Chalciope; the Chalcidians refused to deliver him up at the demand of his father. He is credited with having founded Gyrton; he and Acamas are also the reputed founders of the temple of Aphrodite and Isis in Soli. In Phalerum, of which he presumably was the eponym, there was an altar to his and Theseus’s children.

Phalerus was also the name of a Trojan killed by Neoptolemus.

In popular culture
The field of Phaleristics – the study of medals – is derived from Phalerus's name.
The Argonaut Phalerus (portrayed by actor Andrew Faulds) appears as a minor character in the 1963 fantasy film Jason and the Argonauts, in whose climactic end battle he and his companion Castor are – contrary to mythology – slain by a group of undead skeletons.

Notes

Argonauts
Characters in the Argonautica

References 

 Apollonius Rhodius, Argonautica translated by Robert Cooper Seaton (1853-1915), R. C. Loeb Classical Library Volume 001. London, William Heinemann Ltd, 1912. Online version at the Topos Text Project.
 Apollonius Rhodius, Argonautica. George W. Mooney. London. Longmans, Green. 1912. Greek text available at the Perseus Digital Library.
 Gaius Julius Hyginus, Fabulae from The Myths of Hyginus translated and edited by Mary Grant. University of Kansas Publications in Humanistic Studies. Online version at the Topos Text Project.
 Hesiod, Shield of Heracles from The Homeric Hymns and Homerica with an English Translation by Hugh G. Evelyn-White, Cambridge, MA.,Harvard University Press; London, William Heinemann Ltd. 1914. Online version at the Perseus Digital Library. Greek text available from the same website.
 The Orphic Argonautica, translated by Jason Colavito. © Copyright 2011. Online version at the Topos Text Project.
 Pausanias, Description of Greece with an English Translation by W.H.S. Jones, Litt.D., and H.A. Ormerod, M.A., in 4 Volumes. Cambridge, MA, Harvard University Press; London, William Heinemann Ltd. 1918. . Online version at the Perseus Digital Library
 Pausanias, Graeciae Descriptio. 3 vols. Leipzig, Teubner. 1903.  Greek text available at the Perseus Digital Library.
 Quintus Smyrnaeus, The Fall of Troy translated by Way. A. S. Loeb Classical Library Volume 19. London: William Heinemann, 1913. Online version at theio.com
 Quintus Smyrnaeus, The Fall of Troy. Arthur S. Way. London: William Heinemann; New York: G.P. Putnam's Sons. 1913. Greek text available at the Perseus Digital Library.
 Strabo, The Geography of Strabo. Edition by H.L. Jones. Cambridge, Mass.: Harvard University Press; London: William Heinemann, Ltd. 1924. Online version at the Perseus Digital Library.
 Strabo, Geographica edited by A. Meineke. Leipzig: Teubner. 1877. Greek text available at the Perseus Digital Library.

Attican characters in Greek mythology